This is a list of candidates for the 1927 New South Wales state election. The election was held on 8 October 1927.

Retiring members

Labor
 James Dooley (Bathurst)
 Joseph Fitzgerald (Oxley)
 Robert Greig (Ryde)
 William Holdsworth (Sydney)
 Edward McTiernan (Western Suburbs)
 Bob O'Halloran (Eastern Suburbs)

Nationalist
 William Bagnall (St George)
 Theodore Hill (Oxley)

Other
 William Fell (Independent Nationalist, North Shore)

Legislative Assembly
Sitting members are shown in bold text. Successful candidates are highlighted in the relevant colour. Where there is possible confusion, an asterisk (*) is also used.

This election reintroduced single-member constituencies after three elections conducted under proportional representation. As such, electorates are not listed as being held by any one party.

See also
 Members of the New South Wales Legislative Assembly, 1927–1930

References
 

1927